Ostorhinchus fleurieu (flower cardinalfish, gold cardinalfish, bullseye cardinalfish, cardinalfish, ring-tail cardinalfish or ringtailed cardinalfish) is a species of cardinalfish native to the Red Sea and Persian Gulf, the Gulf of Oman, and the waters around East Africa, Seychelles, India, Sri Lanka, the Indo-Malayan region, and Hong Kong., south to the Ashmore Reef, Western Australia. It is the type species of the genus Ostorhinchus. The specific name honours the French explorer and hydrographer Charles Pierre Claret, comte de Fleurieu (1738-1810) who was a colleague and friend  of Lacepède's.

Description
A coppery-coloured fish with a broad blackish bar at the base of the tail, it is up to 12.5 cm in length. In juveniles, the base of the tail has a spot rather than a bar. The upper jaw has a narrow blue streak, and a broad, blackish stripe extends from the front of the snout to the eye. It is easily confused with Ostorhinchus aureus, where the black tail bar is narrower in the centre than at the ends.

Habitat
Adults occur in small schools made up of pairs of fish from 7 to at least 73 m in depth, associated with coral reefs. It normally occurs in shallow areas with coral reefswhere there are moderate currents. It is found with small to large schools which shelter in crevices.

References

fleurieu
Fish of the Red Sea
Fish described in 1802